KBSN (1470 AM) is a News/Talk and Sports broadcasting radio station licensed to Moses Lake, Washington, United States.  The station is owned by KSEM, Inc. The transmitter for KBSN is located on Marsh Island next to the transmitter for KDRM, its sister station on 99.3 FM.

KBSN is the primary station for Moses Lake High School sports. KBSN is also the primary broadcaster in Moses Lake for the Seattle Seahawks. KBSN and/or KDRM broadcast at local events including the Spring Festival ( Springfest) and Grant County Fair.

References

External links

BSN
Mass media in Grant County, Washington